Waterloo railway station is a railway station in Waterloo, Merseyside, England, on the Northern Line of the Merseyrail network. It serves a largely residential area, although there is a number of shops along South Road, where the station entrance is situated.

History
Waterloo opened in 1848 as the original terminus of the Liverpool, Crosby and Southport Railway. In 1850, the line was extended to Liverpool Exchange. It became part of the Lancashire and Yorkshire Railway (LYR), on 14 June 1855, which took over from the (LCSR). The Lancashire and Yorkshire Railway amalgamated with the London and North Western Railway on 1 January 1922 and in turn was Grouped into the London, Midland and Scottish Railway in 1923. Nationalisation followed in 1948 and in 1978 the station became part of the Merseyrail network's Northern Line (operated by British Rail until privatisation in 1995).

Facilities
The station is staffed 15 minutes before the first service and 15 minutes after the last service. There is platform CCTV, shelters and a booking office. A self-serve ticket machine is also provided in the booking hall. There are departure and arrival screens on the platform for passenger information. The station has secure storage for 30 cycles. The station is fully wheelchair accessible: access to the platforms is via steps or a lift from the ticket office. There is another entry point by means of a ramp from the bus station across South Road, although this has been closed for several years. The station also connects with local bus services.

Services
Trains run northbound to Southport and southbound to Hunts Cross via Liverpool Central at 15 minute frequencies on Mondays to Saturdays, with the first train to Southport being at 06:09 and last train at 23:54, whereas the first train to Hunts Cross is at  06:10 and the last is at 23:25, with a later train to Liverpool Central at 23:43. On summer Sundays, trains run to Southport and Liverpool Central every 15 minutes, but every 30 minutes to Hunts Cross (first train to Southport 0824, first train to Hunts Cross 0825, last trains as Monday - Saturday). On winter Sundays, the entire Southport - Hunts Cross service runs every 30 minutes. The change from summer to winter services and vice versa does not match the standard Network Rail timetable date changes.

Accidents and incidents
On 15 July 1903, a Lancashire and Yorkshire Railway passenger train entered the station at excessive speed and was derailed. Seven people were killed and 116 were injured.

Gallery

References

External links

Railway stations in the Metropolitan Borough of Sefton
DfT Category E stations
Former Lancashire and Yorkshire Railway stations
Railway stations served by Merseyrail
Railway stations in Great Britain opened in 1848